The Caribbean Series Most Valuable Player is an annual award, given to one outstanding player in the Caribbean Series. Since 1949, it has been awarded by journalists of the countries participating in the tournament.

Award winners

See also
Baseball Awards
Caribbean Baseball Hall of Fame

Sources
 Beisbol About
 Major League Baseball
 Nuñez, José Antero (1994). Serie del Caribe de la Habana a Puerto La Cruz. JAN Editor.

References

Baseball trophies and awards
Most valuable player awards
Awards established in 1949